Emmanuel Mayuka (born 21 November 1990) is a Zambian professional footballer who  plays as a striker for NAPSA Stars and the Zambia national team. He was the top scorer in the 2012 Africa Cup of Nations tournament.

Club career
Born in Kabwe, Central Province, Zambia, Mayuka began his career at the Lusaka Academy at the age of 11. In 2007, he joined Kabwe Warriors, one of the biggest clubs in Zambia owned by the national railway company Zambia Railways. In this team, he flourished scoring 15 goals in 23 games. He consequently was selected to the Zambia under-17 national team.

Maccabi Tel Aviv
In September, he joined Israel's Maccabi Tel Aviv. Before opting to join Maccabi Tel Aviv, Mayuka was close to signing for Portuguese side Porto, but the move never materialised. When he moved to Maccabi Tel Aviv, Mayuka joined the youth team where he scored three goals. In April 2010, Mayuka renewed his contract at Maccabi Tel Aviv until 2014.

Young Boys
On 28 May 2010, it was confirmed that Mayuka had signed a five-year contract with Swiss club BSC Young Boys for a transfer fee of £1.7m as a replacement for Seydou Doumbia, who was sold to CSKA Moscow. On 1 December 2010, Mayuka scored two goals in the Europa League against Stuttgart in a 4–2 win. On 17 February 2011, Mayuka scored a last-minute goal against Russian club FC Zenit Saint Petersburg in UEFA Europa League match to help his team to a 2–1 home win.

Southampton
On 28 August 2012, he joined Premier League side Southampton on a five-year deal for an undisclosed fee, reported to be £3 million. He made his debut for Southampton against Manchester United at St. Mary's Stadium on 2 September 2012, coming on as a substitute.

He appeared again as a substitute in a 4–1 victory over Aston Villa, winning a penalty for the fourth goal. On 22 December 2012, he made his first start in a 1–0 loss at home to Sunderland before being substituted after 55 minutes.

His only competitive goal for the club came in a 5–1 victory over Barnsley in the League Cup on 27 August 2013.

On 2 September 2013, Mayuka joined Ligue 1 side Sochaux on a season-long loan deal.

On 30 July 2015, manager Ronald Koeman confirmed that Mayuka 'had no future at Southampton', and he was removed from the first-team, having failed to score in any of his 16 league appearances for Southampton.

Metz
On 31 August 2015, Mayuka joined French club FC Metz of Ligue 2, signing a three-year deal.

Zamalek
On 15 January 2016, Mayuka joined Egyptian club Zamalek on three-and-a-half-year deal.

Hapoel Ra'anana
On 9 November 2017, Mayuka returned to Israel and joined Hapoel Ra'anana.

Green Buffaloes
In April 2019, Mayuka took back to Zambia and joined Green Buffaloes.

NAPSA Stars
In February 2020, Mayuka joined NAPSA Stars.

International career
Mayuka was part of the class of 2007 under-20s which included Fwayo Tembo, Clifford Mulenga, Sebastian Mwansa, William Njovu, Stoppila Sunzu, Joseph Zimba, Rogers Kola, Jacob Banda, Nyambe Mulenga and Dennis Banda. He was the youngest player at the 2007 FIFA U-20 World Cup and the only school boy in the team. Despite not scoring there, many soccer pundits and fans acknowledged his contribution to one of the finest youth squads in Zambian football history.

Mayuka was not part of the U-20s that participated earlier that year at the African Youth Cup in Congo (where Zambia finished fourth) but, in the first game against Jordan, he was picked in the starting line-up, and remained such for the other two group stage matches and the round-of-16 clash with Nigeria.

Mayuka debuted for the senior side in the 2007 COSAFA Cup, scoring the second goal in a 3–0 defeat of Mozambique. Mayuka scored the first goal for Zambia of 2012 Africa Cup of Nations which was score again by his teammate Rainford Kalaba second goal in the game with Zambia earning a victory against Senegal. In the same tournament, he scored against Libya in the group stage, and then he scored the winner in a famous 1–0 victory over Ghana in the semifinals, therefore leading Zambia into the finals. He then played all 120 minutes against Ivory Coast in Zambia's penalty shootout victory against Ivory Coast.

Career statistics
Scores and results list Zambia's goal tally first, score column indicates score after each Mayuka goal.

Honours
Maccabi Tel Aviv
Toto Cup: 2008–09

Zamalek
Egypt Cup: 2016

Zambia
Africa Cup of Nations: 2012

Individual
Africa Cup of Nations Golden Boot: 2012

References

External links
Emmanuel Mayuka profile 

 

1990 births
Living people
People from Kabwe District
Zambian footballers
Zambian expatriate footballers
Zambia international footballers
Association football forwards
Expatriate footballers in Israel
Expatriate footballers in Switzerland
Expatriate footballers in England
Expatriate footballers in France
Expatriate footballers in Egypt
Maccabi Tel Aviv F.C. players
Southampton F.C. players
Zambian expatriate sportspeople in Switzerland
Kabwe Warriors F.C. players
BSC Young Boys players
Israeli Premier League players
Swiss Super League players
Premier League players
FC Sochaux-Montbéliard players
FC Metz players
Ligue 1 players
Ligue 2 players
Zamalek SC players
Egyptian Premier League players
Hapoel Ra'anana A.F.C. players
Green Buffaloes F.C. players
NAPSA Stars F.C. players
2008 Africa Cup of Nations players
2010 Africa Cup of Nations players
2012 Africa Cup of Nations players
2013 Africa Cup of Nations players
2015 Africa Cup of Nations players
Africa Cup of Nations-winning players
Zambia youth international footballers